Vladimir Dmitrievich Ulas (Russian: Владимир Дмитриевич Улас; born 1960,  Baranovichi, Byelorussian SSR) is a Russian politician from the Communist Party of the Russian Federation and a colonel in the Russian Air Force. The head of the Communist Party of the Russian Federation's Moscow committee since 2004. He was elected as a representative of the State Duma in 2007.

Military training

Ulas graduated from with a Gold Medal from the Higher Military Aviation Engineering College in Riga in 1982, after which he went on to study at the Faculty of Computational Mathematics and Cybernetics of Moscow State University. Between 1985 - 2004 Ulas was teaching science at the Air Force Engineering Academy. In 1999 Vladimir Ulas was awarded the rank of colonel in the Armed Forces of Russia.

Political career

Ulas joined the Communist Party of the Soviet Union in 1981. After the fall of the Soviet Union in 1991 when the Communist Party was banned by Boris Yeltsin, Ulas became a prominent member of Gennady Ziuganov's new Communist Party of the Russian Federation. In July 2004 he was elected first secretary of the Party's Moscow City Committee, and in 2005 he was elected deputy of the Moscow City Duma. Since 2007 he is a member of the State Duma.

External links
 Biography

1960 births
Living people
Communist Party of the Russian Federation members
Fifth convocation members of the State Duma (Russian Federation)
Moscow State University alumni
People from Baranavichy
Russian people of Belarusian descent
Russian Air Force officers
Soviet Air Force officers
Deputies of Moscow City Duma